The Texas Rangers 2009 season was the 49th in franchise history and the team's 38th year in Arlington, Texas.

2009 signified the continuation of a strategy implemented by General Manager Jon Daniels in the summer of 2007. The plan to improve the club emphasized the acquisition and development of prospective talent within the Rangers' organization. Several young players such as shortstop Elvis Andrus, outfielder Julio Borbon, and pitchers Derek Holland and Tommy Hunter made their big league debuts in 2009 after spending time in the Rangers' minor league system. Ranked as the #1 farm system by Baseball America prior to the start of the season, the organization began the season with several of its heralded prospects still in the minor leagues. Emergence of these prospects on the Major League level gave the franchise and its fan base a brighter hope for the future, in line with the objective of competing for the A.L. West title in 2010 and beyond.

Notable performances from several core players as well as a well-coached pitching staff contributed to a greatly improved record and allowed the Rangers to compete for the division and wild card playoff berths well into the final weeks of the season.

Preseason
Pitching coach Mark Connor was replaced by Mike Maddux, who worked with team president Nolan Ryan at his first coaching job with the Houston AA affiliate. Maddux joined the Rangers in November after declining to continue his time with the Milwaukee Brewers.
Veteran infielder Michael Young moved from shortstop to third base, the third time in his career he had been asked to change positions. Young initially balked at the request after winning a Gold Glove at shortstop in 2008, and asked to be traded rather than move over. He eventually accepted the front office's decision after speaking with team president Nolan Ryan and remained with the team, making the 2009 A.L. All-Star team in his first year at third base.
1B/3B Hank Blalock's $6.2 million contract option was exercised by the club in November.
C Gerald Laird was traded to Detroit for RHP prospects Guillermo Moscoso and Carlos Melo. The move made Jarrod Saltalamacchia the starting catcher and allowed Taylor Teagarden to start the season as his backup.
INF Omar Vizquel, OF/DH Andruw Jones, and RHP Kris Benson signed minor league contracts during the offseason and earned places on the active roster to begin the season.
Free agent RHP Ben Sheets signed a 2-year deal with the Rangers but he failed the physical after it was discovered his torn flexor tendon would require surgery, preventing him from joining a team in 2009.
RHPs Joaquín Benoit and Eric Hurley began the season on the 60-day D.L. following surgery. Neither pitcher would recover in time for the 2009 season.

Regular season

Opening day starters

Jarrod Saltalamacchia, C
Chris Davis, 1B*
Ian Kinsler, 2B
Michael Young, 3B
Elvis Andrus, SS*
Marlon Byrd, LF
Josh Hamilton, CF
Nelson Cruz, RF
Hank Blalock, DH
Kevin Millwood, RHP

*Rookie

Season summary

April
Record: 10-11

Starting Rotation: RHP Kevin Millwood, RHP Vicente Padilla, RHP Brandon McCarthy, RHP Kris Benson, LHP Matt Harrison, RHP Scott Feldman*

* spot starter

Opening day of the 2009 season saw the Rangers open the year at home for the first time in four years. In a 10-1 victory over the Cleveland Indians, the club roughed up reigning A.L. Cy Young winner Cliff Lee. A sweep of the Indians was quickly forgotten as the Rangers were swept by the Tigers in Detroit over the first weekend of the year. The Rangers dropped 5 games in a row before bouncing back in their last game against the Orioles on April 15. That day, MLB's "Jackie Robinson Day", 2B Ian Kinsler went 6-for-6 at the plate, hitting for the cycle. Kinsler became the fourth player to perform the feat in a Rangers uniform and the first player since 1890 to record a 6-hit cycle. The Rangers dropped the next two games at home to the Royals, and before Sunday's game many observers openly questioned manager Ron Washington's job security. In that game, the Rangers' oft-criticized bullpen recorded four scoreless innings in relief, allowing the lineup to rally in the 8th inning. In a 5-5 tie game, 3B Michael Young led off the bottom of the 9th inning with a 427-foot walk-off home run, the first of his career. Washington's position as manager appeared to be saved as the Rangers headed to Toronto, where they bested Blue Jays ace Roy Halladay in the first game. Game 2 of the series saw the Rangers debuts of LHP prospect Derek Holland and newly acquired RHP Darren O'Day. O'Day, who arrived in Toronto after first pitch, quickly joined the team at the stadium and was informed upon arrival that he would pitch that night. Wearing Kason Gabbard's #60 jersey, O'Day met his new manager, catcher, and teammates on the pitching mound in the 11th inning. O'Day would be credited with the loss after giving up the winning run. While in Toronto, CF Josh Hamilton made a diving catch against the wall in left-center, suffering the first of several injuries in 2009. The Rangers took 3 of 4 games from another series with the Orioles before ending the month against their first division opponent, the Oakland Athletics, splitting the 2-game set.

Transactions:
April 5: 3B Travis Metcalf designated for assignment, claimed on April 8 by the Kansas City Royals.
April 18: RHP Josh Rupe designated for assignment, later cleared waivers and assigned to extended spring training.
April 22: RHP Darren O'Day claimed off waivers from the New York Mets.
April 24: LHP Kason Gabbard traded to the Boston Red Sox for cash considerations.

May
Record: 20-9

Starting Rotation: Millwood, Padilla, McCarthy, Feldman, Harrison, LHP Derek Holland*, RHP Tommy Hunter*

*spot starter

The Rangers performed exceedingly well in the month of May, enjoying one of the best months in team history to date. The club quickly went 13-3, a stretch which saw the return (and subsequent re-injury) of Josh Hamilton, several superb outings by Matt Harrison, and mounting concern over the quality of 1B Chris Davis. Aside from two walk-off hits, the 23-year-old was batting .203 by the end of the month, a stark and inexplicable contrast to the breakout season he posted in 2008. Notable was a 3-game sweep of the division rival Los Angeles Angels in Arlington. Domination of each series over division opponents helped the Rangers reach first place in the American League West, and a record 10 games above .500 by the end of May. Young pitchers Tommy Hunter and Derek Holland each earned spot starts during May, each showing flashes of what could be achieved in the future.

Transactions: None.

June
Record: 11-15

Starting Rotation: Millwood, Padilla, McCarthy, Holland, Harrison, Hunter*

*spot starter

As the summer months began, the Rangers faltered. Vicente Padilla, an enigmatic presence in the clubhouse and a pitcher that previously led the majors in hit batsmen, was placed on outright waivers June 3. With very little explanation from the club, the Rangers essentially gave up their number two starter to anyone that would have him. Rumors about Padilla's negative attitude in the clubhouse abound, though the official party line was that management was disappointed with the way the right-handed handled adversity after a start the previous afternoon. Though Padilla cleared waivers, this issue would remain unresolved. In conjunction with the roster issues, a major power outage up and down the Rangers' lineup haunted the club throughout the month of June. On June 9, Josh Hamilton reportedly underwent surgery to repair an abdominal muscle, and RHP Brandon McCarthy was sent to the 15-day DL for shoulder issues. LHP Matt Harrison and closer Frank Francisco found themselves on the disabled list as well later into the month. These consistent injuries prevented any major gains in the standings. The last day of June saw the call-up of rookie OF Julio Borbon and the Rangers' lead on the A.L. West slowly dwindling as the second-place Angels encroached.

Transactions:
June 3: RHP Vicente Padilla placed on outright waivers, cleared them, and rejoined the team.
June 8: Manager Ron Washington's contract extended by front office through the 2010 season.
June 26: INF Germán Durán placed on waivers, claimed by the Houston Astros.

July
Record: 17-8

Starting Rotation: Millwood, Padilla, Feldman, Hunter, Holland, RHP Dustin Nippert*, RHP Doug Mathis*

*spot starter

DH Hank Blalock drilled a walk-off home run on the evening of July 1 against the Angels, the beginning of a month in which the Rangers would bounce back from a dreadful June. Rumors in the media continued to circulate about the club's finances, including one that suspected Major League Baseball was loaning money to Hicks Sports Group in order to pay its debts and continue team operations. A great deal of speculation surrounded the Rangers' ability to acquire talent through trades due to a financial impasse. In part due to the return of OF Josh Hamilton on July 6, 1B Chris Davis was optioned to AAA to allow him to work out his issues at the plate. Davis, known for his defensive prowess at first base, failed to continue improving at the Major League level. Hank Blalock was given the first base job for the time being. On the 9th in Anaheim, California, OF/DH Andruw Jones hit 3 home runs in a game, essentially the highlight of an otherwise unspectacular season for the veteran. At the All-Star break, the Rangers remained in control of the A.L. West. Representing the team at the 2009 All-Star Game in St. Louis were 3B Michael Young, OF Josh Hamilton, and RF Nelson Cruz, who like Hamilton in 2008, earned second place in the Home Run Derby. By July 20, the club was 49-41 overall as closer Frank Francisco returned to the DL with pneumonia and several other players miss time late in the month due to bouts with the flu. With the trade deadline looming at the end of the month, the Toronto Blue Jays were assumed to be interested in trading their ace, RHP Roy Halladay, and Rangers observers began speculating on whether or not the club should make a bid. Many felt that a fair trade could be headlined by LHP Derek Holland. As talks reportedly heated up between the teams and an agreement was close, on the eve of deadline day Holland took the mound against Seattle and threw 8 scoreless innings (4 perfect innings), allowing only one hit. Halladay and Holland would remain with their respective teams for the time being.

Transactions:
July 7: RHP Dustin Nippert activated from the 60-day disabled list; RHP Brandon McCarthy (shoulder) transferred to the 60-day D.L.
July 25: LHP Matt Harrison (Thoracic Outlet Syndrome) transferred from the 15-day D.L. to the 60-day D.L.

August
Record: 14-15

Starting Rotation: Millwood, Padilla, Feldman, Holland, Hunter, Nippert*

*spot starter

The Rangers traveled to Oakland, precipitating the call-up of RHP Neftalí Feliz from AAA Oklahoma City for the first time. Feliz came out of the bullpen to debut in relief on the night of August 3 and immediately struck out 5 of his first 6 batters faced in two innings of work, his fastball averaging 98.8 mph and maxing out at 100.5 mph. Despite the A's walk-off win that night, Feliz easily secured his place on the big league club. On offense, similar struggles experienced in June seemingly returned to the Rangers in the dog days of the season and many critics pointed to tenured hitting coach Rudy Jaramillo, known for his aggressive philosophy. A surprising development on August 8 occurred when number two starter Vicente Padilla was designated for assignment. After his placement on waivers in June, Padilla's issues with teammates and the front office had not been smoothed over and following a particularly poor start against Oakland, the team decided to end its relationship with the Nicaraguan right-hander.

Around the same date, photographs of OF Josh Hamilton surfaced on Deadspin.com, showing him visibly intoxicated at an Arizona bar with various women. Hamilton, whose long struggle and recovery from substance abuse was well documented in the public eye, admitted to relapsing in January 2009 and acknowledged that he notified his family and Rangers officials immediately thereafter. Hamilton remembered little of the night, but a drug test several days later came up negative. The weekend of August 15 saw the Boston Red Sox arrive in Arlington tied with the Rangers for the A.L. Wild Card berth. After rallying on Friday night in the top of the 9th inning against closer Frank Francisco, the Rangers stormed back on Saturday. In that game, Neftalí Feliz earned his first Major League save, and on Sunday afternoon the Rangers won the series as Francisco successfully converted the save. C Jarrod Saltalamacchia went on the 15-day D.L. with symptoms of Thoracic Outlet Syndrome, leaving Taylor Teagarden as the only catcher on the roster. Career minor-leaguer C Kevin Richardson was called up for the first time to spell Teagarden, while the front office worked a deal to re-acquire former Ranger Iván Rodríguez.

The financial issues often quietly mentioned in the media finally erupted on August 17 when the Rangers were unable to sign 2009 first-round draft pick LHP Matt Purke, who opted to attend college and pitch for Texas Christian University. Purke's representatives reportedly asked for a contract close to $4 million, but the club was unable to accept such terms. The Purke affair confirmed the fears of many Rangers fans that the front office's ability to improve the team was restricted by Hicks Sports Group's large debts.

With injuries taking their toll once again, the Rangers found themselves in second place in the West at the end of August, losing 6 of 10 heading into September.

Transactions:
August 8: RHP Vicente Padilla designated for assignment, later placed on irrevocable release waivers and claimed by the Los Angeles Dodgers.
August 19: C Iván Rodríguez acquired from the Houston Astros in exchange for minor-leaguers INF Jose Vallejo and RHP Matt Nevarez
August 27: RHP Jason Jennings designated for assignment and placed on waivers.

September
Record: 13-15

Starting Rotation: Millwood, Feldman, Holland, Hunter, McCarthy, Nippert*

*spot starter

In the second game of a double-header on September 1, Michael Young strained his left hamstring running out an infield single. The injury sidelined the veteran leader for 2–3 weeks, an omen that the Rangers chances to make the playoffs were shrinking. With the ballclub 4 games back of the Angels on September 6 and the performance of staff ace Kevin Millwood unravelling, the Rangers got another bit of bad news when it was reported that Josh Hamilton would be out indefinitely with a pinched nerve in his back. The team pressed hard and generally did little to improve its place in the standings throughout September, and questions concerning the future ownership of the Rangers heated up as playoff potential cooled. Groups under Pittsburgh attorney Chuck Greenberg, Houston businessman Jim Crane, and sports agent Dennis Gilbert quickly became known amongst fans as the three main factions jockeying for rights to negotiate with Hicks Sports Group. The emergence of these prospective owners set the stage for a long, complex battle of attrition for ownership of the franchise over the next eleven months. Despite the team's fading hopes, Ian Kinsler joined the "30-30 club" by hitting his 30th home run on September 25 after stealing 30 bases in 2009. On September 27, the Angels clinched the A.L. West championship after defeating Texas 11-0 in Anaheim. Though a slim chance to win the A.L. Wild Card still lingered, this would not be achieved and the Texas Rangers would miss the postseason for the tenth year in a row.

Transactions:
September 3: RHP prospect Danny Gutierrez acquired from the Royals for minor leaguers C Manny Piña and OF Tim Smith

October
Record: 2-2

Starting Rotation: Millwood, Holland, Hunter, Feldman

The season would end in October due to certain schedule oddities. The majority of concerns by the end of the regular season surrounded the multitude of arbitration-eligible players on the roster and securing key pieces of the team for the 2010 season. The Rangers ended their season after a 4-3 loss in Seattle at the hands of Cy Young candidate Félix Hernández.

Transactions: None.

2009 roster and statistics

Roster

Season standings

Record vs. opponents

Game log 

|-  style="text-align:center; background:#bfb;"
| 1 || April 6 || Indians || 9–1 || Millwood (1–0) || Lee (0–1) || || 49,916 || 1–0
|-  style="text-align:center; background:#bfb;"
| 2 || April 8 || Indians || 8–5 || Padilla (1–0) || Carmona (0–1) || Francisco (1) || 22,829 || 2–0
|-  style="text-align:center; background:#bfb;"
| 3 || April 9 || Indians || 12–8 || McCarthy (1–0) || Pavano (0–1) || || 14,672 || 3–0
|-  style="text-align:center; background:#fbb;"
| 4 || April 10 || @ Tigers || 15–2 || Galarraga (1–0) || Benson (0–1) || || 44,588 || 3–1
|-  style="text-align:center; background:#fbb;"
| 5 || April 11 || @ Tigers || 4–3 || Robertson (1–0) || Harrison (0–1) || Rodney (1) || 28,693 || 3–2
|-  style="text-align:center; background:#fbb;"
| 6 || April 12 || @ Tigers || 6–4 || Lyon (1–1) || Wilson (0–1) || Rodney (2) || 18,905 || 3–3
|-  style="text-align:center; background:#fbb;"
| 7 || April 13 || Orioles || 10–9 || Uehara (2–0) || Padilla (1–1) || Sherrill (3) || 12,184 || 3–4
|-  style="text-align:center; background:#fbb;"
| 8 || April 14 || Orioles || 7–5 (10) || Johnson (1–0) || Guardado (0–1) || || 14,041 || 3–5
|-  style="text-align:center; background:#bfb;"
| 9 || April 15 || Orioles || 19–6 || Benson (1–1) || Hendrickson (1–1) || || 17,539 || 4–5
|-  style="text-align:center; background:#fbb;"
| 10 || April 17 || Royals || 12–3 || Meche (1–0) || Harrison (0–2) || || 24,062 || 4–6
|-  style="text-align:center; background:#fbb;"
| 11 || April 18 || Royals || 2–0 || Greinke (3–0) || Millwood (1–1) || || 37,635 || 4–7
|-  style="text-align:center; background:#bfb;"
| 12 || April 19 || Royals || 6–5 || Francisco (1–0) || Farnsworth (0–3) || || 27,635 || 5–7
|-  style="text-align:center; background:#bfb;"
| 13 || April 21 || @ Blue Jays || 5–4 || McCarthy (2–0) || Halladay (3–1) || Francisco (2) || 20,996 || 6–7
|-  style="text-align:center; background:#fbb;"
| 14 || April 22 || @ Blue Jays || 8–7 (11) || Frasor (3–0) || Wilson (0–2) || || 13,090 || 6–8
|-  style="text-align:center; background:#fbb;"
| 15 || April 23 || @ Blue Jays || 5–2 || Richmond (2–0) || Millwood (1–2) || Downs (1) || 15,487 || 6–9
|-  style="text-align:center; background:#bfb;"
| 16 || April 24 || @ Orioles || 5–4 || Wilson (1–2) || Sherrill (0–1) || Francisco (3) || 24,319 || 7–9
|-  style="text-align:center; background:#bfb;"
| 17 || April 25 || @ Orioles || 6–5 || Feldman (1–0) || Hendrickson (1–3) || Francisco (4) || 41,160 || 8–9
|-  style="text-align:center; background:#fbb;"
| 18 || April 26 || @ Orioles || 8–5 || Báez (1–1) || Jennings (0–1) || Sherrill (4) || 22,896 || 8–10
|-  style="text-align:center; background:#bfb;"
| 19 || April 27 || @ Orioles || 6–4 || Harrison (1–2) || Albers (0–1) || Francisco (5) || 10,621 || 9–10
|-  style="text-align:center; background:#bfb;"
| 20 || April 28 || Athletics || 5–4 || Millwood (2–2) || Wuertz (1–1) || Francisco (6) || 12,627 || 10–10
|-  style="text-align:center; background:#bbb;"
| || April 29 || Athletics || colspan=6 |Postponed
|-  style="text-align:center; background:#fbb;"
| 21 || April 30 || Athletics || 4–2 || Braden (3–2) || Padilla (1–2) || Wuertz (1) || 13,802 || 10–11
|-

|-  style="text-align:center; background:#fbb;"
| 22 || May 1 || White Sox || 4–3 || Buehrle (4–0) || Holland (0–1) || Jenks (6) || 23,836 || 10–12
|-  style="text-align:center; background:#bfb;"
| 23 || May 2 || White Sox || 9–6 || McCarthy (3–0) || Contreras (0–4) || Francisco (7) || 26,673 || 11–12
|-  style="text-align:center; background:#bfb;"
| 24 || May 3 || White Sox || 5–1 || Harrison (2–2) || Danks (2–2) || || 20,132 || 12–12
|-  style="text-align:center; background:#bfb;"
| 25 || May 4 || @ Mariners || 6–5 || Millwood (3–2) || Hernández (4–1) || Francisco (8) || 16,421 || 13–12
|-  style="text-align:center; background:#bfb;"
| 26 || May 5 || @ Mariners || 7–2 (10) || O'Day (1–0) || Stark (0–1) || || 19,810 || 14–12
|-  style="text-align:center; background:#bfb;"
| 27 || May 6 || @ Athletics || 3–2 || Feldman (2–0) || Giese (0–3) || Francisco (9) || 15,342 || 15–12
|-  style="text-align:center; background:#fbb;"
| 28 || May 7 || @ Athletics || 9–4 || Cahill (1–2) || McCarthy (3–1) || || 13,702 || 15–13
|-  style="text-align:center; background:#bfb;"
| 29 || May 8 || @ White Sox || 6–0 || Harrison (3–2) || Contreras (0–5) || || 21,326 || 16–13
|-  style="text-align:center; background:#fbb;"
| 30 || May 9 || @ White Sox || 3–2 || Linebrink (1–1) || Millwood (3–3) || Jenks (7) || 28,864 || 16–14
|-  style="text-align:center; background:#bfb;"
| 31 || May 10 || @ White Sox || 7–1 || Padilla (2–2) || Colón (2–3) || || 25,844 || 17–14
|-  style="text-align:center; background:#bfb;"
| 32 || May 12 || Mariners || 7–1 || Holland (1–1) || Lowe (0–1) || || 16,564 || 18–14
|-  style="text-align:center; background:#bfb;"
| 33 || May 13 || Mariners || 6–5 (11) || Wilson (2–2) || Morrow (0–2) || || 25,865 || 19–14
|-  style="text-align:center; background:#bfb;"
| 34 || May 14 || Mariners || 3–2 || Harrison (4–2) || Morrow (0–3) || || 21,002 || 20–14
|-  style="text-align:center; background:#bfb;"
| 35 || May 15 || Angels || 10–8 || Millwood (4–3) || Saunders (5–2) || Wilson (1) || 33,429 || 21–14
|-  style="text-align:center; background:#bfb;"
| 36 || May 16 || Angels || 5–3 || Padilla (3–2) || Loux (2–3) || Wilson (2) || 34,284 || 22–14
|-  style="text-align:center; background:#bfb;"
| 37 || May 17 || Angels || 3–0 || Jennings (1–1) || Weaver (3–2) || O'Day (1) || 37,146 || 23–14
|-  style="text-align:center; background:#fbb;"
| 38 || May 19 || @ Tigers || 4–0 || Willis (1–0) || McCarthy (3–2) || || 23,756 || 23–15
|-  style="text-align:center; background:#fbb;"
| 39 || May 20 || @ Tigers || 5–3 || Verlander (4–2) || Harrison (4–3) || Rodney (7) || 23,417 || 23–16
|-  style="text-align:center; background:#fbb;"
| 40 || May 21 || @ Tigers || 4–3 || Jackson (4–2) || Millwood (4–4) || Rodney (8) || 34,356 || 23–17
|-  style="text-align:center; background:#bfb;"
| 41 || May 22 || @ Astros || 6–5 (10) || O'Day (2–0) || Hawkins (1–2) || Francisco (10) || 36,017 || 24–17
|-  style="text-align:center; background:#bfb;"
| 42 || May 23 || @ Astros || 6–3 || Feldman (3–0) || Moehler (1–3) || Wilson (3) || 36,019 || 25–17
|-  style="text-align:center; background:#bfb;"
| 43 || May 24 || @ Astros || 5–0 || McCarthy (4–2) || Hampton (2–4) || || 36,749 || 26–17
|-  style="text-align:center; background:#fbb;"
| 44 || May 25 || Yankees || 11–1 || Hughes (3–2) || Harrison (4–4) || || 48,914 || 26–18
|-  style="text-align:center; background:#bfb;"
| 45 || May 26 || Yankees || 7–3 || Jennings (2–1) || Aceves (3–1) || || 33,397 || 27–18
|-  style="text-align:center; background:#fbb;"
| 46 || May 27 || Yankees || 9–2 || Burnett (3–2) || Holland (1–2) || || 38,409 || 27–19
|-  style="text-align:center; background:#bfb;"
| 47 || May 29 || Athletics || 6–3 || Wilson (3–2) || Casilla (1–2) || Francisco (11) || || 28–19
|-  style="text-align:center; background:#bfb;"
| 48 || May 29 || Athletics || 5–2 || Feldman (4–0) || González (0–1) || Wilson (4) || 30,496 || 29–19
|-  style="text-align:center; background:#bfb;"
| 49 || May 30 || Athletics || 14–1 || McCarthy (5–2) || Anderson (2–5) || || 45,325 || 30–19
|-  style="text-align:center; background:#fbb;"
| 50 || May 31 || Athletics || 5–4 || Bailey (4–0) || Francisco (1–1) || || 22,952 || 30–20
|-

|-  style="text-align:center; background:#fbb;"
| 51 || June 2 || @ Yankees || 12–3 || Burnett (4–2) || Padilla (3–3) || || 43,948 || 30–21
|-  style="text-align:center; background:#bfb;"
| 52 || June 3 || @ Yankees || 4–2 || Feldman (5–0) || Pettitte (5–2) || Francisco (12) || 44,452 || 31–21
|-  style="text-align:center; background:#fbb;"
| 53 || June 4 || @ Yankees || 8–6 || Robertson (1–0) || Wilson (3–3) || Rivera (12) || 45,713 || 31–22
|-  style="text-align:center; background:#bfb;"
| 54 || June 5 || @ Red Sox || 5–1 || Millwood (5–4) || Penny (5–2) || || 37,519 || 32–22
|-  style="text-align:center; background:#fbb;"
| 55 || June 6 || @ Red Sox || 8–1 || Lester (5–5) || Holland (1–3) || || 37,828 || 32–23
|-  style="text-align:center; background:#bfb;"
| 56 || June 7 || @ Red Sox || 6–3 || Padilla (4–3) || Matsuzaka (1–4) || Wilson (5) || 37,537 || 33–23
|-  style="text-align:center; background:#fbb;"
| 57 || June 8 || Blue Jays || 6–3 || Janssen (2–2) || Feldman (5–1) || Downs (8) || 17,856 || 33–24
|-  style="text-align:center; background:#fbb;"
| 58 || June 9 || Blue Jays || 9–0 || Tallet (4–3) || Mathis (0–1) || || 17,535 || 33–25
|-  style="text-align:center; background:#bbb;"
| || June 10 || Blue Jays || colspan=6 |Postponed
|-  style="text-align:center; background:#bfb;"
| 59 || June 11 || Blue Jays || 1–0 || Millwood (6–4) || Romero (3–3) || Wilson (6) || 16,073 || 34–25
|-  style="text-align:center; background:#bfb;"
| 60 || June 12 || Dodgers || 6–0 || Padilla (5–3) || Kuroda (1–2) || || 36,591 || 35–25
|-  style="text-align:center; background:#fbb;"
| 61 || June 13 || Dodgers || 3–1 || Wade (2–3) || Grilli (0–2) || Broxton (15) || 37,262 || 35–26
|-  style="text-align:center; background:#fbb;"
| 62 || June 14 || Dodgers || 6–3 || Billingsley (9–3) || Holland (1–4) || Broxton (16) || 36,343 || 35–27
|-  style="text-align:center; background:#bfb;"
| 63 || June 16 || Astros || 6–1 || Millwood (7–4) || Rodríguez (5–6) || || 21,676 || 36–27
|-  style="text-align:center; background:#bfb;"
| 64 || June 17 || Astros || 5–4 (10) || Wilson (4–3) || Fulchino (2–2) || || 32,425 || 37–27
|-  style="text-align:center; background:#fbb;"
| 65 || June 18 || Astros || 5–3 || Árias (1–0) || Jennings (2–2) || Valverde (3) || 25,445 || 37–28
|-  style="text-align:center; background:#fbb;"
| 66 || June 19 || @ Giants || 6–4 || Romo (1–0) || Feldman (5–2) || Wilson (18) || 31,241 || 37–29
|-  style="text-align:center; background:#fbb;"
| 67 || June 20 || @ Giants || 2–1 (11) || Romo (2–0) || Jennings (2–3) || || 33,312 || 37–30
|-  style="text-align:center; background:#fbb;"
| 68 || June 21 || @ Giants || 3–2 || Zito (4–7) || Millwood (7–5) || Wilson (19) || 41,292 || 37–31
|-  style="text-align:center; background:#fbb;"
| 69 || June 23 || @ D-backs || 8–2 || Scherzer (5–4) || Harrison (4–5) || || 21,379 || 37–32
|-  style="text-align:center; background:#bfb;"
| 70 || June 24 || @ D-backs || 2–1 || Padilla (6–3) || Haren (6–5)|| Wilson (7) || 20,031 || 38–32
|-  style="text-align:center; background:#bfb;"
| 71 || June 25 || @ D-backs || 9–8 (12) || Guardado (1–1) || Vásquez (1–2) || || 19,376 || 39–32
|-  style="text-align:center; background:#bfb;"
| 72 || June 26 || Padres || 12–2 || Millwood (8–5) || Silva (0–1) || || 33,340 || 40–32
|-  style="text-align:center; background:#fbb;"
| 73 || June 27 || Padres || 7–3 || Correia (5–5) || Holland (1–5) || || 25,410 || 40–33
|-  style="text-align:center; background:#fbb;"
| 74 || June 28 || Padres || 2–0 || Gaudin (4–6) || Hunter (0–1) || Bell (21) || 27,000 || 40–34
|-  style="text-align:center; background:#fbb;"
| 75 || June 29 || Angels || 5–2 || O'Sullivan (2–0) || Padilla (6–4) || Fuentes (22) || 16,985 || 40–35
|-  style="text-align:center; background:#bfb;"
| 76 || June 30 || Angels || 9–5 || Feldman (6–2) || Saunders (8–5) || || 20,042 || 41–35
|-

|-  style="text-align:center; background:#bfb;"
| 77 || July 1 || Angels || 9–7 || Francisco (2–1) || Speier (3–2) || || 27,142 || 42–35
|-  style="text-align:center; background:#bfb;"
| 78 || July 3 || Rays || 3–1 || Hunter (1–1) || Kazmir (4–5) || Francisco (13) || 39,123 || 43–35
|-  style="text-align:center; background:#bfb;"
| 79 || July 4 || Rays || 12–4 || Holland (2–5) || Price (2–3) || || 43,809 || 44–35
|-  style="text-align:center; background:#bfb;"
| 80 || July 5 || Rays || 5–2 || Feldman (7–2) || Garza (6–6) || Francisco (14) || 22,324 || 45–35
|-  style="text-align:center; background:#fbb;"
| 81 || July 6 || @ Angels || 9–4 || Weaver (9–3) || Millwood (8–6) || || 35,691 || 45–36
|-  style="text-align:center; background:#bfb;"
| 82 || July 7 || @ Angels || 8–5 || Holland (3–5) || Lackey (3–4) || || 42,088 || 46–36
|-  style="text-align:center; background:#bfb;"
| 83 || July 8 || @ Angels || 8–1 || Padilla (7–4) || Santana (1–5) || || 37,364 || 47–36
|-  style="text-align:center; background:#fbb;"
| 84 || July 9 || @ Mariners || 3–1 || Hernández (9–3) || Wilson (4–4) || Aardsma (18) || 24,823 || 47–37
|-  style="text-align:center; background:#bfb;"
| 85 || July 10 || @ Mariners || 6–4 || Feldman (8–2) || Morrow (0–4) || Francisco (15) || 34,874 || 48–37
|-  style="text-align:center; background:#fbb;"
| 86 || July 11 || @ Mariners || 4–1 || Washburn (6–6) || Millwood (8–7) || Aardsma (19) || 30,698 || 48–38
|-  style="text-align:center; background:#fbb;"
| 87 || July 12 || @ Mariners || 5–3 || Batista (6–3) || O'Day (2–1) || Aardsma (20) || 33,220 || 48–39
|-  style="text-align:center; background:#fbb;"
| 88 || July 17 || Twins || 5–3 || Perkins (5–5) || Padilla (7–5) || Nathan (24) || 34,662 || 48–40
|-  style="text-align:center; background:#fbb;"
| 89 || July 18 || Twins || 4–1 || Baker (8–7) || Feldman (8–3) || Nathan (25) || 31,041 || 48–41
|-  style="text-align:center; background:#bfb;"
| 90 || July 19 || Twins || 5–3 (12) || Nippert (1–0) || Duensing (0–1) || || 27,204 || 49–41
|-  style="text-align:center; background:#bfb;"
| 91 || July 20 || Red Sox || 6–3 || Millwood (9–7) || Smoltz (1–3) || Wilson (8) || 28,916 || 50–41
|-  style="text-align:center; background:#bfb;"
| 92 || July 21 || Red Sox || 4–2 || Hunter (2–1) || Beckett (11–4) || Wilson (9) || 28,555 || 51–41
|-  style="text-align:center; background:#bfb;"
| 93 || July 22 || Red Sox || 3–1 || Nippert (2–0) || Buchholz (1–1) || Mathis (1) || 39,778 || 52–41
|-  style="text-align:center; background:#bfb;"
| 94 || July 24 || @ Royals || 2–0 || Feldman (9–3) || Greinke (10–6) || Wilson (10) || 25,012 || 53–41
|-  style="text-align:center; background:#fbb;"
| 95 || July 25 || @ Royals || 6–3 || Hochevar (6–3) || Holland (3–6) || Soria (15) || 27,602 || 53–42
|-  style="text-align:center; background:#bfb;"
| 96 || July 26 || @ Royals || 7–2 || Nippert (3–0) || Mahay (1–1) || || 16,847 || 54–42
|-  style="text-align:center; background:#bfb;"
| 97 || July 27 || Tigers || 5–2 || Hunter (3–1) || Galarraga (5–9) || Wilson (11) || 17,173 || 55–42
|-  style="text-align:center; background:#bfb;"
| 98 || July 28 || Tigers || 7–3 || Grilli (1–2) || French (1–2) || || 21,615 || 56–42
|-  style="text-align:center; background:#fbb;"
| 99 || July 29 || Tigers || 13–5 || Verlander (12–5) || Feldman (9–4) || || 33,235 || 56–43
|-  style="text-align:center; background:#bfb;"
| 100 || July 30 || Mariners || 7–1 || Holland (4–6) || Olson (3–5) || || 23,949 || 57–43
|-  style="text-align:center; background:#bfb;"
| 101 || July 31 || Mariners || 5–4 || Padilla (8–5) || Vargas (3–5) || Wilson (12) || 36,901 || 58–43
|-

|-  style="text-align:center; background:#fbb;"
| 102 || August 1 || Mariners || 7–2 || Hernández (12–4) || Hunter (3–2) || || 29,458 || 58–44
|-  style="text-align:center; background:#bfb;"
| 103 || August 2 || Mariners || 4–2 || Feldman (10–4) || White (2–2) || Wilson (13) || 28,670 || 59–44
|-  style="text-align:center; background:#fbb;"
| 104 || August 3 || @ Athletics || 3–2 || Wuertz (6–1) || Wilson (4–5) || || 10,523 || 59–45
|-  style="text-align:center; background:#fbb;"
| 105 || August 4 || @ Athletics || 6–0 || González (3–2) || Holland (4–7) || || 10,781 || 59–46
|-  style="text-align:center; background:#fbb;"
| 106 || August 5 || @ Athletics || 7–5 || Breslow (5–5) || Padilla (8–5) || Bailey (15) || 20,560 || 59–47
|-  style="text-align:center; background:#bfb;"
| 107 || August 6 || @ Athletics || 6–4 || Hunter (4–2) || Cahill (6–11) || Wilson (13) || 17,214 || 60–47
|-  style="text-align:center; background:#bfb;"
| 108 || August 7 || @ Angels || 11–6 || Feldman (11–4) || Saunders (9–7) || || 43,624 || 61–47
|-  style="text-align:center; background:#fbb;"
| 109 || August 8 || @ Angels || 3–2 || Weaver (12–3) || Guardado (1–2) || Fuentes (31) || 37,166 || 61–48
|-  style="text-align:center; background:#bfb;"
| 110 || August 9 || @ Angels || 7–0 || Holland (5–7) || Lackey (7–5) || || 35,706 || 62–48
|-  style="text-align:center; background:#fbb;"
| 111 || August 11 || @ Indians || 5–0 || Laffey (6–3) || Nippert (3–1) || || 21,870 || 62–49
|-  style="text-align:center; background:#bfb;"
| 112 || August 12 || @ Indians || 5–0 || Hunter (5–2) || Carmona (2–7) || || 18,794 || 63–49
|-  style="text-align:center; background:#bfb;"
| 113 || August 13 || @ Indians || 4–1 || Feldman (12–4) || Sowers (4–8) || Francisco (16) || 20,090 || 64–49
|-  style="text-align:center; background:#fbb;"
| 114 || August 14 || Red Sox || 8–4 || Saito (3–3) || Francisco (2–2) || || 40,311 || 64–50
|-  style="text-align:center; background:#bfb;"
| 115 || August 15 || Red Sox || 7–2 || Holland (6–7) || Penny (7–7) || Feliz (1) || 48,201 || 65–50
|-  style="text-align:center; background:#bfb;"
| 116 || August 16 || Red Sox || 4–3 || Nippert (4–1) || Tazawa (1–2) || Francisco (17) || 27,155 || 66–50
|-  style="text-align:center; background:#bfb;"
| 117 || August 17 || Twins || 8–5 || Hunter (6–2) || Liriano (5–12) || Francisco (18) || 17,940 || 67–50
|-  style="text-align:center; background:#fbb;"
| 118 || August 18 || Twins || 9–6 || Crain (4–4) || Jennings (2–4) || Nathan (30) || 20,931 || 67–51
|-  style="text-align:center; background:#fbb;"
| 119 || August 19 || Twins || 5–4 || Baker (11–7) || Millwood (9–8) || Nathan (31) || 33,479 || 67–52
|-  style="text-align:center; background:#bfb;"
| 120 || August 20 || Twins || 11–1 || Holland (7–7) || Swarzak (3–7) || || 21,870 || 68–52
|-  style="text-align:center; background:#fbb;"
| 121 || August 21 || @ Rays || 5–3 || Kazmir (8–7) || Nippert (4–2) || Howell (15) || 20,639 || 68–53
|-  style="text-align:center; background:#fbb;"
| 122 || August 22 || @ Rays || 5–4 (10) || Balfour (5–2) || Grilli (1–3) || || 34,281 || 68–54
|-  style="text-align:center; background:#bfb;"
| 123 || August 23 || @ Rays || 4–0 || Feldman (13–4) || Price (6–6) || || 29,101 || 69–54
|-  style="text-align:center; background:#bfb;"
| 124 || August 25 || @ Yankees || 10–9 || Millwood (10–8) || Chamberlain (8–4) || || 46,511 || 70–54
|-  style="text-align:center; background:#fbb;"
| 125 || August 26 || @ Yankees || 9–2 || Pettitte (11–6) || Holland (7–8) || || 46,461 || 70–55
|-  style="text-align:center; background:#bfb;"
| 126 || August 27 || @ Yankees || 7–2 || Grilli (2–3) || Burnett (10–8) || || 47,209 || 71–55
|-  style="text-align:center; background:#fbb;"
| 127 || August 28 || @ Twins || 3–2 || Duensing (2–1) || Hunter (6–3) || Nathan (33) || 21,641 || 71–56
|-  style="text-align:center; background:#bfb;"
| 128 || August 29 || @ Twins || 3–0 || Feldman (14–4) || Pavano (11–10) || Francisco (19) || 28,516 || 72–56
|-  style="text-align:center; background:#fbb;"
| 129 || August 30 || @ Twins || 5–3 || Rauch (1–0) || Wilson (4–6) || Nathan (34) || 29,282 || 72–57
|-  style="text-align:center; background:#fbb;"
| 130 || August 31 || Blue Jays || 18–10 || Cecil (6–3) || Holland (7–9) || || 16,675 || 72–58
|-

|-  style="text-align:center; background:#bfb;"
| 131 || September 1 || Blue Jays || 5–2 || Nippert (5–2) || Rzepczynski (2–4) || Francisco (20) || || 73–58
|-  style="text-align:center; background:#bfb;"
| 132 || September 1 || Blue Jays || 5–2 || McCarthy (6–2) || Tallet (5–9) || Francisco (21) || 17,203 || 74–58
|-  style="text-align:center; background:#bfb;"
| 133 || September 2 || Blue Jays || 6–4 || Hunter (7–3) || Richmond (6–8) || Francisco (22) || 21,836 || 75–58
|-  style="text-align:center; background:#bfb;"
| 134 || September 4 || @ Orioles || 5–1 || Feldman (15–4) || Tillman (1–3) || Feliz (2) || 15,557 || 76–58
|-  style="text-align:center; background:#fbb;"
| 135 || September 5 || @ Orioles || 5–4 || Matusz (4–2) || Millwood (10–9) || Johnson (8) || 18,028 || 76–59
|-  style="text-align:center; background:#fbb;"
| 136 || September 6 || @ Orioles || 7–0 || Guthrie (10–13) || Holland (7–10) || || 21,599 || 76–60
|-  style="text-align:center; background:#bbb;"
| || September 7 || @ Indians || colspan=6 |Postponed
|-  style="text-align:center; background:#bfb;"
| 137 || September 8 || @ Indians || 11–9 || Feliz (1–0) || Lewis (2–4) || || || 77–60
|-  style="text-align:center; background:#bfb;"
| 138 || September 8 || @ Indians || 10–5 || McCarthy (7–2) || Laffey (7–5) || || 12,976 || 78–60
|-  style="text-align:center; background:#bfb;"
| 139 || September 9 || @ Indians || 10–0 || Feldman (16–4) || Carmona (3–10) || || 14,637 || 79–60
|-  style="text-align:center; background:#bbb;"
| || September 11 || Mariners || colspan=6 |Postponed
|-  style="text-align:center; background:#fbb;"
| 140 || September 12 || Mariners || 8–3 || Morrow (1–4) || Millwood (10–10) || || 22,468 || 79–61
|-  style="text-align:center; background:#bfb;"
| 141 || September 13 || Mariners || 7–2 || Hunter (8–3) || Fister (2–2) || || || 80–61
|-  style="text-align:center; background:#fbb;"
| 142 || September 13 || Mariners || 5–0 || Hernández (15–5) || Holland (7–11) || || 18,522 || 80–62
|-  style="text-align:center; background:#fbb;"
| 143 || September 14 || Athletics || 9–0 || Tomko (5–3) || Feldman (16–5) || || 13,669 || 80–63
|-  style="text-align:center; background:#fbb;"
| 144 || September 15 || Athletics || 6–1 || Breslow (7–7) || McCarthy (7–3) || || 15,964 || 80–64
|-  style="text-align:center; background:#fbb;"
| 145 || September 16 || Athletics || 4–0 || Cahill (9–12) || Nippert (5–3) || || 23,372 || 80–65
|-  style="text-align:center; background:#fbb;"
| 146 || September 18 || Angels || 2–0 || Kazmir (9–8) || Hunter (8–4) || Fuentes (43) || 34,240 || 80–66
|-  style="text-align:center; background:#bfb;"
| 147 || September 19 || Angels || 3–2 || Feldman (17–5) || Weaver (15–7) || Francisco (23) || 46,596 || 81–66
|-  style="text-align:center; background:#fbb;"
| 148 || September 20 || Angels || 10–5 || Lackey (11–8) || Holland (7–12) || || 33,688 || 81–67
|-  style="text-align:center; background:#bfb;"
| 149 || September 21 || @ Athletics || 10–3 || Millwood (11–10) || González (0–3) || || 10,581 || 82–67
|-  style="text-align:center; background:#fbb;"
| 150 || September 22 || @ Athletics || 9–1 || Cahill (10–12) || McCarthy (7–4) || || 10,475 || 82–68
|-  style="text-align:center; background:#bfb;"
| 151 || September 23 || @ Athletics || 9–8 || Hunter (9–4) || Mortensen (2–3) || Francisco (24) || 18,311 || 83–68
|-  style="text-align:center; background:#fbb;"
| 152 || September 24 || @ Athletics || 12–3 || Anderson (11–10) || Feldman (17–6) || || 11,124 || 83–69
|-  style="text-align:center; background:#bfb;"
| 153 || September 25 || Rays || 8–3 || Holland (8–12) || Shields (10–12) || || 29,232 || 84–69
|-  style="text-align:center; background:#bfb;"
| 154 || September 26 || Rays || 15–3 || Millwood (12–10) || Garza (8–11) || || 31,855 || 85–69
|-  style="text-align:center; background:#fbb;"
| 155 || September 27 || Rays || 7–6 || Choate (1–0) || Francisco (2–3) || Cormier (2) || 37,905 || 85–70
|-  style="text-align:center; background:#fbb;"
| 156 || September 28 || @ Angels || 11–0 || Santana (8–8) || Hunter (9–5) || || 40,484 || 85–71
|-  style="text-align:center; background:#fbb;"
| 157 || September 29 || @ Angels || 5–2 || O'Sullivan (4–2) || Feldman (17–7) || Fuentes (46) || 38,600 || 85–72
|-  style="text-align:center; background:#fbb;"
| 158 || September 30 || @ Angels || 5–0 || Palmer (11–2) || Holland (8–13) || || 40,616 || 85–73
|-

|-  style="text-align:center; background:#bfb;"
| 159 || October 1 || @ Angels || 11–3 || Millwood (13–10) || Bell (1–2) || || 38,552 || 86–73
|-  style="text-align:center; background:#bfb;"
| 160 || October 2 || @ Mariners || 7–4 || Wilson (5–6) || Aardsma (3–6) || Francisco (26) || 27,899 || 87–73
|-  style="text-align:center; background:#fbb;"
| 161 || October 3 || @ Mariners || 2–1 || Rowland-Smith (5–4) || Hunter (9–6) || Batista (1) || 24,391 || 87–74
|-  style="text-align:center; background:#fbb;"
| 162 || October 4 || @ Mariners || 4–3 || Hernández (19–5) || Feldman (17–8) || Aardsma (38) || 32,26 || 87–75
|-

Player statistics

Team leadersPitchingBatting'Batting
2009 Texas Rangers batting statistics at Baseball ReferenceNote: Pos = Position; G = Games played; AB = At bats; R = Runs; H = Hits; HR = Home runs; RBI = Runs batted in; AVG = Batting average; SB = Stolen basesPitching
2009 Texas Rangers pitching statistics at Baseball ReferenceNote: G = Games; IP = Innings pitched; W = Wins; L = Losses; SV = Saves; ERA = Earned run average; H = Hits Allowed; BB = Walks Allowed; SO = Strikeouts''

Scoring by inning
Stats updated through October 4th.

Game log summary
Stats updated through October 4th.

Comeback Wins: 38, Largest Comeback: 4 runs

Blown Leads: 30, Largest Blown Lead: 5 runs

Walk-off Wins: 6

Walk-off Losses: 4

Farm system

References

External links

2009 Texas Rangers season at Baseball Reference
2009 Texas Rangers season at Baseball Almanac

Texas Rangers seasons
Texas Rangers
Rangers